Adriana Achcińska (born 22 April 2002) is a Polish footballer who plays as a midfielder for Ekstraliga club UKS SMS Łódź and the Poland women's national team.

International goals

References

External links

2002 births
Living people
Polish women's footballers
Women's association football midfielders
UKS SMS Łódź players
1. FC Köln (women) players
Poland women's international footballers
Polish expatriate footballers
Polish expatriate sportspeople in Germany
Expatriate women's footballers in Germany